Phi Mu is the second oldest female fraternal organization established in the United States.

Phi Mu is one of the two "Macon Magnolias," a term used to celebrate the bonds it shares with Alpha Delta Pi as sororities founded on that same campus.

Today, Phi Mu has 136 active collegiate chapters, 137 active alumnae chapters, and more than 187,000 initiated sisters. In its 170-year history, Phi Mu has chartered over 228 chapters. Phi Mu's National Headquarters is in Peachtree City, Georgia. Phi Mu's national philanthropy is Children's Miracle Network Hospitals.

Phi Mu is one of 26 national sororities which are members under the umbrella organization of the National Panhellenic Conference.

History

Phi Mu was founded on January 4, 1852 – though not publicly announced until March 4, 1852 – originally as a literary society referred to as The Philomathean Society at Wesleyan College by Mary Ann Dupont (Lines), Mary Elizabeth Myrick (Daniel), and Martha Bibb Hardaway (Redding). Philomathean is derived from the Greek philomath, which means a lover of learning. The Society joined the National Panhellenic Conference in 1904, taking on the Greek letters Phi Mu.

Phi Mu is referred to as a women's fraternity since some sororities predate the term "sorority" and are thus known as "fraternities for women." Phi Mu is one such sorority, and its formal name is Phi Mu Fraternity.

In 1939, Alpha Delta Theta, a small national sorority founded at Transylvania University, merged with Phi Mu.

Symbols
Although Phi Mu has no official jewel, the fraternity recognizes official colors of rose, symbolizing womanhood, and white, symbolizing truth and purity. The official flower is the rose-colored carnation, while the symbol is a quatrefoil. Phi Mu's official mascot is a lion named Sir Fidel.

A Phi Badge is worn by Phi Mu's provisional members. It is a small gold and black quatrefoil pin bearing the Φ symbol. Initiated members wear the Phi Mu Badge, which depicts a quatrefoil with black and gold enamel bearing ΦΜ, a hand holding a heart, and three stars. Sometimes the badge is partnered with a guard chain accompanied by the chapter's lettering (for example, the Kappa Omicron chapter of Phi Mu would have a ΚΟ assisting).

Phi Mu's open motto is Les Soeurs Fideles ("The Faithful Sisters"). The fraternity's creed is the uniting statement that every member of Phi Mu is expected to know and live her life by, defining what it means to be a noble woman and enumerating several practices.  The second-to-last line of the creed sums up the most important Phi Mu belief: "To practice day by day love, honor, truth."

Philanthropy
Phi Mu's interest in philanthropy is expressed in the first line of its Creed, "To lend to those less fortunate a helping hand," a guiding principle for Phi Mu. As the sorority sponsor for Children's Miracle Network Hospitals, Phi Mu is committed to raising more than $500,000 for the hospitals every year. The money raised and donated is used locally or to support one of the 170 Children's Miracle Network Hospitals nationwide. In total, Phi Mu has contributed over $21 million and many hours in an attempt to improve the quality of life for sick children and their families throughout the country. Phi Mu has also established an annual "National Philanthropy Day" each October.

Local chapter or individual member misconduct
In 2010, the Phi Mu chapter at the University of Texas at San Antonio was disciplined for hazing and humiliating pledges. Pledges were blindfolded, roped, and forced to a remote barn to recite the sorority's creed and imitate animals for the amusement of initiated members of the sorority.

In 2011, the sorority made national headlines after the chapter at the University of Southern Mississippi dressed in blackface for a "Cosby" themed party. The sorority members involved were placed on probation by Phi Mu's national headquarters and offered a public apology for their misconduct.

In 2013 and 2014, sorority women from multiple chapters at the University of Alabama – including Phi Mu, Chi Omega, Delta Delta Delta, Alpha Omicron Pi, Kappa Delta, Pi Beta Phi, and Alpha Gamma Delta, – alleged that either active members or some of their alumnae had prevented them from offering membership to black candidates because of their race. Phi Mu member Caroline Bechtel told Marie Claire that the chapter would automatically add any minority woman to a list of women to be dropped as a membership candidate. Bechtel and fellow students held a campus march to integrate greek life on campus, and following media and national outcry, the university held a second round of recruitment in hopes of offering membership to more women, including black women. In the aftermath, Bechtel described hostility towards her from the sorority. Phi Mu offered membership to one black woman.

Membership

Notable alumnae

Arts and entertainment

Tena Clark (Alpha Omicron) -Music Producer and Author of Southern Discomfort
Andi Dorfman (Alpha Eta)- The Bachelorette (2014)- Author “ It’s Not Okay” and “Single State of Mind.” Previous contestant on the Bachelor, The Bachelorette.
Hannah Godwin (Kappa Chi) - Model, Contestant on The Bachelor (2019) and Bachelor in Paradise (2019).
Susan Harling (Kappa Iota) - inspiration for the play and movie Steel Magnolias
Ashley Hatfield (Alpha Delta) - Miss Illinois (2007), contestant in Miss America (2008)
Arlie Honeycutt (Lambda Iota) - Miss North Carolina (2012) Honeycutt received the Miss North Carolina Overall Talent award as well as a Talent Preliminary award at the Miss North Carolina 2012 competition. She received a Most Talented Non-Finalist award at the 2013 Miss America Pageant.
Elizabeth Horton (Gamma Tau)- Miss North Carolina (2006), contestant in Miss America (2007)
Dana Ivey (Alpha Omega) - actress (The Addams Family, Sleepless in Seattle, Orange County), five-time Tony nominee
Hayley Lewis (Theta) - Miss Tennessee 2014
Pam Long (Theta Alpha) - Miss Alabama (1974), contestant in Miss America (1975) and head writer for CBS' Guiding Light
Leah Massee (Kappa Beta) - Miss Georgia (2007), contestant in Miss America (2008)
Meg McGuffin (Alpha Mu) - Miss Alabama (2015) Fourth Runner- Up to Miss America 2016
Madeline Mitchell (Alpha Zeta)- Miss Alabama USA (2011) - Top 3 in Miss USA 2011 pageant, Mrs. America 2015
Amy Mulkey (Alpha Alpha) - Miss Georgia (2002), contestant in Miss America (2002)
Rachel Reilly (Gamma Mu)- Big Brother (Seasons 12 & 13 winner) The Amazing Race (Seasons 20, 24, & 31) The Bold and the Beautiful actress BiteSizeTV Host, Producer Hollywood Today Live correspondent Actress;
Joanne Rogers (Alpha Omega) - Wife of Fred Rogers of Mister Roger’s Neighborhood, pianist
Kimberly Schlapman (Alpha Gamma) - member of Little Big Town
Stephanie Steuri (Iota Alpha) - Miss Hawaii (2014)
Alyse Madej (Rho Beta) - Miss Michigan USA  (2019) Represented Michigan at the Miss USA 2019 Competition 
Anna Laura Bryan Strider (Alpha Gamma) - Miss Alabama (2012) Received the Quality of Life Award and Top 12 in Miss America
Mary Wickes (Zeta Epsilon) - actress, (Little Women, White Christmas (1954 film), Sister Act)

Business
Pat Mitchell (Alpha Alpha) - president, PBS
Evett Simmons (Alpha Tau) - president of the National Bar Association (2000)
Toria Tolley (Beta Nu) - VP/consultant, The Psychological Advantage, former CNN weekend anchor

Science, technology, engineering and math

Jerrie Mock (Psi) - first woman to fly solo around the world
 Kathy Pham (Theta Zeta) - computer scientist, First Lady Michelle Obama's Guest to the 2015 State of the Union Address, Nguoi Viet 40 under 40.
Mary Weber (Delta Epsilon) - astronaut

Politics and public service
Carol Laise (Gamma Delta) - U.S. Ambassador to Nepal 1966-1973, first woman director general of the Foreign Service
Beverly B. Martin (Alpha Iota) -  U.S. Federal Judge, sits on the United States Court of Appeals for the Eleventh Circuit
Betty Montgomery (Delta Kappa) - first female Attorney General of Ohio
Melinda Schwegmann (Alpha Eta) - first female Lt. Governor of Louisiana
Elizabeth Weaver (Delta) - former Michigan Supreme Court Justice and Chief Justice
Tova Wiley (Eta Alpha) - first woman to hold the rank of Commander in the U.S. Navy, winner of the Legion of Merit Award

Literature
Rebecca Faye Smith Galli (Gamma Lambda) - author, Rethinking Possible - A Memoir of Resilience; co-founder, Pathfinders for Autism; Baltimore Sun op-ed contributor
Jill McCorkle (Gamma Lambda) - author, Good Ol' Girls and eight other novels and short story collections, five of which are New York Times notable books
Joyce Carol Oates (Beta Zeta) - author, (Blonde, The Gravedigger's Daughter, We Were the Mulvaneys)
 Debbie Phelps (Beta Chi) - author, A Mother for All Seasons & mother of Michael Phelps
Kathryn Stockett (Alpha Zeta) - author, The Help

Athletics

Gayle S. Barron (Alpha Alpha) - winner of the Boston Marathon, 1978

Chapters

References

External links

Phi Mu
Phi Mu Foundation

 
1852 establishments in Georgia (U.S. state)
National Panhellenic Conference
Student societies in the United States
Student organizations established in 1852